Richard Clerke may refer to:

 Richard Clarke (priest) or Clerke (died 1634)
Richard Clerke (died 1530), MP for Lincoln

See also
Richard Clerk (disambiguation)
Richard Clarke (disambiguation)
Richard Clark (disambiguation)